Juan Pablo Rodríguez Conde (born 14 June 1982) is a Uruguayan football midfielder who plays for Ittihad FC in the Saudi Professional League.

Career
Rodríguez started his career at Racing Club de Montevideo in 2001. He played there until 2003 where he was transferred to Argentine Primera División side Estudiantes de La Plata team where he did not enjoyed much success and finally he was purchased by Nacional. After 2 years of success he moved in 2008 to Cerrito, where he was later loaned to Racing Club de Montevideo again. Time later he was purchased by Defensor Sporting, but he played few matches, so again in 2009 he decided to play for Indios de Ciudad Juárez, where his maximum premium was saving the team from relegatio in Primera División de México Clausura 2009.

After half a year in Mexican San Luis, Rodríguez joined All Boys, recently promoted to the Argentine Primera División. In January 2013, he returned to Mexico for UNAM.

Honours

Defensor
Uruguayan Primera División: 2007–08

Racing
Uruguayan Segunda División: 2007–08

References

External links
 Argentine Primera statistics at Fútbol XXI
 
 profile at soccerway

1982 births
Living people
Uruguayan footballers
Footballers from Montevideo
Association football midfielders
Uruguayan Primera División players
Liga MX players
Argentine Primera División players
Racing Club de Montevideo players
Sportivo Cerrito players
Defensor Sporting players
Indios de Ciudad Juárez footballers
San Luis F.C. players
Estudiantes de La Plata footballers
All Boys footballers
Club Universidad Nacional footballers
Club de Gimnasia y Esgrima La Plata footballers
Ittihad FC players
Uruguayan expatriate footballers
Expatriate footballers in Mexico
Expatriate footballers in Argentina
Expatriate footballers in Saudi Arabia
Saudi Professional League players
University of Montevideo alumni
20th-century Uruguayan engineers